Routine Breathing is the second album by American post-hardcore band Slaves. The album was released on August 21, 2015. This is the first album to feature Weston Richmond on rhythm guitar and Colin Viera on bass. It is the last album by the band released under the Artery Recordings label.

Background
On January 7, 2015, the band uploaded a picture to their Facebook page claiming that they were starting work on their second album, which was followed, on July 5, with a track listing featuring 15 songs.

The album was scheduled for an October release date, but was pushed to August 21, 2015. On July 9, the debut single "Burning Our Morals Away" from their second album was leaked via leak websites across the web, and July 10, the single was released. On July 23, the band released the second single, "Death Never Let Us Say Goodbye" after the song had leaked. On August 16, the band released the third single "Drowning In My Addiction" with a lyric video. The track ""One God"" is an acoustic rendition of the song "There Is Only One God and His Name Is Death" from their debut album, Through Art We Are All Equals.

Track listing

Personnel
Slaves
 Jonny Craig – lead vocals
 Alex Lyman – lead guitar
 Weston Richmond – rhythm guitar
 Colin Viera – bass
 Tai Wright – drums

Additional personnel
Garret Rapp – guest vocals on "The Hearts of Our Broken"
Spencer Chamberlain – guest vocals on "Who Saves the Savior"
Kyle Lucas – guest vocals on "Share the Sunshine Young Blood, Pt. 2"
Tilian Pearson – guest vocals on "Winter Everywhere"

Production
Cameron Mizell – producer, engineer
Alex Lyman – producer, engineer
Craig Baker – engineer
Joel Pack – engineer
Ricky Orozco – assistant engineer

References

2015 albums
Slaves (American band) albums
Artery Recordings albums
Albums produced by Cameron Mizell